"A Walking Song" is a poem in The Lord of the Rings. It appears in the third chapter, entitled "Three is Company". It is given its title in the work's index to songs and poems. There is a companion poem near the end of the novel.

The poem has been set to music by the Danish group The Tolkien Ensemble.

While the poem itself does not appear in The Lord of the Rings film trilogy, parts of it are featured throughout, including in the song "The Edge of Night" sung by Billy Boyd in The Lord of the Rings: The Return of the King which has lyrics from the last verse.

Context

The hobbit Frodo Baggins is travelling to Bucklebury in the Shire, accompanied by his gardener and friend Sam Gamgee and his kinsman Pippin Took. Frodo is ostensibly moving to a newly purchased house, having sold his hobbit-hole to his relatives, the Sackville-Bagginses. However, he and Sam have secretly planned to journey beyond, to Bree where he will meet again with Gandalf, so that they can travel to Rivendell; Frodo has the Ring of the Dark Lord Sauron in his possession, and he believes it will be safe there. They journey into the night, and at this point

They began to hum softly, as hobbits have a way of doing as they walk along, especially when they are drawing near to home at night. With most hobbits it is a supper-song or a bed-song; but these hobbits hummed a walking-song (though not, of course, without any mention of supper and bed).Text of "A Walking Song"

Frodo's uncle Bilbo Baggins, who had adopted him, had made up the words "to a tune that was as old as the hills, and taught it to Frodo as they walked in the lanes of the Water-valley and talked about Adventure". After the song ends, the hobbits encounter a Black Rider for the second time.

A different walking song, "The Road Goes Ever On", appears in different versions in The Hobbit, the first and third chapters of The Fellowship of the Ring – the first two by Bilbo, the third instance spoken by Frodo, alongside "A Walking Song"; and again in chapter six of The Return of the King, where again it is voiced by Bilbo.

"A Walking Song" is mirrored at the end of the novel, in the chapter "The Grey Havens". Frodo sings part of the song with slightly changed words, as he is leaving for the Undying Lands.

Interpretation 

The road in A Walking Song has been seen as a metaphor for destiny and experience for both Bilbo and Frodo that begins at their home Bag End. According to Tom Shippey, the name Bag End is a direct translation of French cul-de-sac meaning a dead end or a road with only one outlet. The journeys of Bilbo and Frodo have been interpreted as such a confined road as they both start and end their respective adventures in Bag End. According to Don D. Elgin, A Walking Song is "a song about the roads that go ever on until they return to at last to the familiar things they have always known."

Ralph C. Wood concludes from a Christian point of view that A Walking Song references the inevitable journey towards death and beyond.

The character Bottom, who describes his dream as something that "the eye of man hath not heard, the eye of man hath not seen" in William Shakespeare's A Midsummer Night's Dream, has been likened to the version of A Walking Song modified to tell of the "hidden path" Frodo seeks.

Adaptations

In film 

Part of "A Walking Song" is featured in Peter Jackson's 2003 The Lord of the Rings: The Return of the King. Some lines from the poem are part of a larger montage entitled "The Steward of Gondor", written by Howard Shore and arranged by Philippa Boyens. The song is called "The Edge of Night" after a phrase in the lyrics. Its melody was composed by Billy Boyd, who plays Pippin.

In this version, Denethor, the Steward of Gondor residing in its capital Minas Tirith, bids Pippin to sing for him while he eats. At the same time, Denethor's son Faramir attempts to retake the city of Osgiliath which has been occupied by Orcs, as requested by his father. The mission  is a futile one. Pippin sings while Faramir and his horsemen are riding in slow motion to be massacred by the Orcs. As the song ends, Pippin begins to cry softly, as he realizes that Faramir most likely died in vain to try to prove to his father that he was like his slain older brother Boromir, whom Denethor loved greatly. In a later scene, a gravely wounded Faramir is dragged back to the city by his horse, to his father's remorse.

Pippin's song in the film is only a fraction of Tolkien's poem, the lines being a sample of the last stanza, some slightly rewritten.

According to Jackson, the song was devised while shooting the film. Boyd envisioned the song to be one that Pippin had "probably heard his grandfather sing, you know, from when the hobbits were looking for the Shire." The song was recorded in Abbey Road Studios in London. Boyd called it "a huge highlight" of his career.

Paul Broucek, executive music producer at New Line Cinema, comments: "Instead of a noisy battle scene, you have the juxtaposition of the beautiful, haunting melody that Billy created and sings, and that Howard supports with very simple underpinnings of orchestra growing out of it."

Frodo's variation on the song in the book was used for the soundtrack of the film, when Frodo and company are at the Grey Havens; the lyrics were translated into Sindarin by David Salo.

The scenes featuring "The Edge of Night" were largely invented by the film's writers; in the book, although Denethor asks Pippin if he can sing, no song is ever requested.

The lyrics sung in the film are:

Shore wrote the orchestral accompaniment. The song happens to share the opening perfect fifth interval that opens Shore's Gondor theme (where it is sung in the film) and the melody moves in a stepwise motion in the Dorian mode, much like his Shire themes.

The phrase "home is behind, the world ahead" is uttered by Gandalf near the beginning of the 2012 film The Hobbit: An Unexpected Journey, as Bilbo and the dwarves leave the Shire for the first time. The film score then picks out a few bars of the melody to the song as it features in the later films. The song is used in the 2003 The Return of the King and in the teaser trailer of 28 July 2014 for The Hobbit: The Battle of the Five Armies, which tells the "adventure" of the poem. The film features a new, related song written by Boyd, called "The Last Goodbye."

Musical settings 

Both versions of the poem have been set to music by the Danish group The Tolkien Ensemble, with melodies composed by its member Peter Hall. They appear on the group's album At Dawn in Rivendell (2002). 
A cover of the "Edge of Night" song as used in the film appears on the eponymous final album of former Tolkien Ensemble member, Nick Keir.

See also

 Music of The Lord of the Rings film series
 Music of the Hobbit film series
 The Road Goes Ever On (song)

References

Primary
This list identifies each item's location in Tolkien's writings.

Secondary

Middle-earth music
Songs written for films
2003 songs
Poems in The Lord of the Rings